Mary Elizabeth Rubens is a Canadian film, stage, and television actress, who made her feature film debut in Paul Lynch's slasher film Prom Night (1980). She subsequently appeared in Firebird 2015 AD (1981). She worked throughout the 1980s in television, guest-starring on Night Heat (1985–1987) and Alfred Hitchcock Presents (1987–1988). From 1989 to 1993, she had a leading role on the series E.N.G., for which she was nominated for a Gemini Award. 

After a traumatic brain injury in the 1990s left Rubens with a permanent disability, she shifted focus from acting, and subsequently earned a degree in law & society from York University. In 2018, she appeared in Judith Thompson's stage production of After the Blackout, a play about, and starring, people with various disabilities.

Career
Rubens made her feature film debut in Paul Lynch's slasher film Prom Night (1980). She subsequently had a supporting role in Firebird 2015 AD (1981).

In 1987, she appeared in Souvenirs with Theatre Calgary. In 1990, Rubens was nominated for a Gemini Award for her performance in the pilot of E.N.G.. In 1995, she appeared in the film The Michelle Apartments.

After suffering a traumatic brain injury in the 1990s, Rubens was left with a permanent disability and temporarily retired from acting. She subsequently enrolled at York University, graduating with an honours degree in law & society.

In 2018, she returned to theater in the RARE Theatre Company's After the Blackout, a play by Judith Thompson, which featured a cast of performers with varying disabilities. Isabelle Perrone of BroadwayWorld noted that Rubens "approached her character seemingly with ease, playing the aged starlet with elegance."

Filmography

Film

Television

Select stage credits

References

External links

 

Actresses from Kingston, Ontario
Canadian film actresses
Canadian stage actresses
Canadian television actresses
People with traumatic brain injuries
York University alumni
Year of birth missing (living people)
Living people